There are  known exoplanets, or planets outside the Solar System that orbit a star, as of ; only a small fraction of these are located in the vicinity of the Solar System. Within , there are 97 exoplanets listed as confirmed by the NASA Exoplanet Archive. Among the over 500 known stars and brown dwarfs within 10 parsecs, around 60 have been confirmed to have planetary systems; 51 stars in this range are visible to the naked eye, eight of which have planetary systems.

The first report of an exoplanet within this range was in 1998 for a planet orbiting around Gliese 876 (15.3 light-years (ly) away), and the latest as of 2022 is one around EQ Pegasi A (20 ly). The closest exoplanets are those found orbiting the star closest to the solar system, which is Proxima Centauri and it is 4.25 light years away. The first confirmed exoplanet discovered in the Proxima Centauri system was Proxima Centauri b, in 2016. HD 219134 (21.6 ly) has six exoplanets, the highest number discovered for any star within this range.

Most known nearby exoplanets orbit close to their stars. A majority are significantly larger than Earth, but a few have similar masses, including planets around YZ Ceti, Gliese 367, and Proxima Centauri which may be less massive than Earth. Several confirmed exoplanets are hypothesized to be potentially habitable, with Proxima Centauri b and Gliese 667 Cc (23.6 ly) considered among the most likely candidates. The International Astronomical Union has assigned proper names to some known extrasolar bodies, including nearby exoplanets, through the NameExoWorlds project. Planets named in the 2015 event include the planets around Epsilon Eridani (10.5 ly) and Fomalhaut, while planets that will be named in the 2022 event include those around Gliese 436, Gliese 486, and Gliese 367.

Exoplanets within 10 parsecs

Excluded objects
Unlike for bodies within the Solar System, there is no clearly established method for officially recognizing an exoplanet. According to the International Astronomical Union, an exoplanet should be considered confirmed if it has not been disputed for five years after its discovery. There have been examples where the existence of exoplanets has been proposed, but even after follow-up studies their existence is still considered doubtful by some astronomers. Such cases include Wolf 359 (7.9 ly, in 2019), LHS 288 (15.8 ly, in 2007),
40 Eridani A (16.3 ly, in 2018),
and Gliese 1151 (26.2 ly, in 2021).
There are also several instances where proposed exoplanets were later disproved by subsequent studies, including candidates around Alpha Centauri B (4.36 ly),
Barnard's Star (5.96 ly),

Kapteyn's Star (12.8 ly),
Van Maanen 2 (14.1 ly),
Groombridge 1618 (15.9 ly),
AD Leonis (16.2 ly),
Gliese 682 (16.3 ly),
VB 10 (19.3 ly), and Fomalhaut (25.1 ly).

In 2021, a candidate planet was detected around Vega, though it has yet to be confirmed. Another candidate planet, Candidate 1, was directly imaged around Alpha Centauri A, though it may also be a clump of asteroids or an artifact of the discovery mechanism.

The Working Group on Extrasolar Planets of the International Astronomical Union adopted in 2003 a working definition on the upper limit for what constitutes a planet: not being massive enough to sustain thermonuclear fusion of deuterium. Some studies have calculated this to be somewhere around 13 times the mass of Jupiter, and therefore objects more massive than this are usually classified as brown dwarfs. Some proposed candidate exoplanets were later shown to be massive enough to fall above the threshold, and are likely brown dwarfs, as was the case for: SCR 1845-6357 B (13.1 ly), SDSS J1416+1348 B (30.3 ly), and WISE 1217+1626 B (30 ly).

Excluded from the current list are known examples of potential free-floating sub-brown dwarfs, or "rogue planets", which are bodies that are too small to undergo fusion yet they do not revolve around a star. Known such examples include: WISE 0855–0714 (7.4 ly), UGPS 0722-05, (13.4 ly) WISE 1541−2250 (18.6 ly), and SIMP J01365663+0933473 (20.0 ly).

See also 

 List of nearest stars and brown dwarfs
 List of nearest bright stars
 List of nearest terrestrial exoplanet candidates
 List of nearest free floating planetary mass objects
 Lists of exoplanets
 Lists of planets
 List of planet types
 List of potentially habitable exoplanets
 Lists of astronomical objects

Notes

References

External links 
 
 
 
 
 
 
 
 

Planetary systems
Nearest
nearest exoplanets